The 11th National Congress of the Chinese Communist Party was convened August 12–18, 1977, about five years before the 12th National Congress, and four years after the 10th National Congress.  The Congress formally declared the Cultural Revolution officially over after 11 long years, ending a long chapter of Chinese history. The Gang of Four were fully criticized for their role in the revolution. Hua Guofeng was formally elected as Chairman of the 11th Central Committee of the Chinese Communist Party and was elected to the chairmanship of the Central Military Commission. The Political Bureau was also renewed with new memberships when the 11th Politburo was elected as a result of the congress.

References

1977 conferences
1977 in China
National Congress of the Chinese Communist Party